Rushcreek Township is one of the thirteen townships of Fairfield County, Ohio, United States. As of the 2010 census the population was 3,893, of whom 2,468 lived in the unincorporated portions of the township.

Geography
Located in the southeastern corner of the county, it borders the following townships:
Richland Township - north
Reading Township, Perry County - northeast
Jackson Township, Perry County - east
Monday Creek Township, Perry County - southeast corner
Marion Township, Hocking County - south
Berne Township - southwest
Pleasant Township - northwest

The village of Bremen is located in central Rushcreek Township, and part of the census-designated place of Hide-A-Way Hills lies in the township's south.

Name and history
This township took its name from Rush Creek. It is the only Rushcreek Township statewide, although there is a Rushcreek Township in Logan County.

Government
The township is governed by a three-member board of trustees, who are elected in November of odd-numbered years to a four-year term beginning on the following January 1. Two are elected in the year after the presidential election and one is elected in the year before it. There is also an elected township fiscal officer, who serves a four-year term beginning on April 1 of the year after the election, which is held in November of the year before the presidential election. Vacancies in the fiscal officership or on the board of trustees are filled by the remaining trustees.

References

External links
Township website
County website

Townships in Fairfield County, Ohio
Townships in Ohio